The following is the complete list of the 385 Virtual Console titles (384 titles in Oceania) that were available for the Wii in the PAL region (Europe and Oceania) sorted by system and release dates. The final update was on September 5, 2013, as the service has been discontinued in all regions.  The Virtual Console would go on to continue on the Wii U and 3DS but neither service has seen new games since 2018.  A Successor to both services was made with the introduction of NES and later SNES games on Nintendo Switch Online

Nintendo discontinued the Wii Shop Channel on January 31, 2019, worldwide (with the purchase of Wii Points for new games having ended on March 26, 2018, worldwide).

Available titles

Nintendo Entertainment System (500 Nintendo Points)
There were 79 games (77 in Oceania) available.

Super Nintendo Entertainment System (800 Nintendo Points)
There were 65 games (64 in Europe) available.

Nintendo 64 (1000 Nintendo Points)
There were 21 games available.

TurboGrafx-16/PC Engine (600/800 Nintendo Points)
There were 61 games available.

Sega Master System (500 Nintendo Points)
There were 16 games available.

Sega Mega Drive (800 Nintendo Points)
There were 74 games available.

Neo Geo (900 Nintendo Points)
There were 54 games available.

Commodore 64 (500 Nintendo Points)
The entire system catalogue has been discontinued since August 2013.

Virtual Console Arcade (500 Nintendo Points)
There were 20 games available.

Update notes

2007
The April 6 update was on April 5 because of Good Friday.
The May 18 update was on May 16 due to Ascension Day, although the games were removed around 1:00AM CET the next day and later readded on May 18.
Turbografx games were originally not available in Australia, however they were introduced in the July 6 update.
Australia got four Turbografx games in an additional update on August 7.
The first Hanabi Festival with earlier Japan- and/or North America-only games started in September. The imported games are often released in three consecutive weeks and cost an additional 100 Nintendo points (200 Nintendo points for Nintendo 64 games). A total of six titles were released this time: Gradius III, Mario's Super Picross, Ninja Gaiden, Ninja JaJaMaru-kun, Sin and Punishment (which received an English translation/localization for its VC release) and Super Mario Bros.: The Lost Levels (later removed). Ninja Gaiden was originally released as Shadow Warriors, but now retains its American name and 60 Hz-only refresh rate so it is considered as an import title instead.
Neo Geo titles were added to the VC service for the first time on October 5.
Pokémon Snap was added alongside the VC gift giving feature on December 11.
The December 28 update was on December 25 as a 'Christmas present'.

2008
Commodore 64 titles were added to the European VC service for the first time on March 28.
Sega Master System titles were added to the VC service for the first time on April 11.
The second Hanabi Festival started in early May and nine import titles were released: Break In, Cho Aniki, Columns III: Revenge of Columns, Digital Champ: Battle Boxing, Final Soldier, Gley Lancer,  Gradius II: Gofer no Yabou,  Puyo Puyo 2, and Star Parodier.
VC games were released every fortnight with WiiWare games being released every other week instead between June 2008 and April 2009. This cycle was broken only on August 29, 2008 (part of Hanabi Festival 3) and on March 25, 2009 (VCA launch).
The third Hanabi Festival started in late August and six import titles were released: Bio Miracle Bokutte Upa, Dig Dug, DoReMi Fantasy: Milon's DokiDoki Adventure, Spelunker, Super Mario Bros.: The Lost Levels (re-released) and Super Mario RPG: Legend of the Seven Stars.

2009
Arcade titles were added to the VC service for the first time alongside a Wii system update on March 25.
The fourth Hanabi Festival started in early July and was extended to four weeks. Eight import titles were released: Bomberman '94, Detana!! TwinBee, Kirby's Dream Land 3, M.U.S.H.A., Ogre Battle: The March of the Black Queen, Pulseman, Smash Table Tennis and Zoda's Revenge: StarTropics II.
Starting with the release of Street Fighter II': Champion Edition on December 18, import titles began to be released outside of Hanabi Festival weeks.

2010
Last Ninja 3 was removed from the VC service on February 23 as the emulation had a game-breaking bug which prevented the player from progressing beyond the first level. Purchasers of the game have received a refund.
The fifth Hanabi Festival started in March and five import titles were released: Castlevania: Rondo of Blood, Ironclad, Lode Runner, Milon's Secret Castle and Ogre Battle 64: Person of Lordly Caliber.
Four import titles were released outside of Hanabi Festival weeks: Final Fantasy on May 7, Final Fantasy II on June 11, Shadow of the Ninja on July 9 (originally released as Blue Shadow) and Super Bonk on December 10 (originally released as Super B.C. Kid).

2011
No Hanabi Festival was held this year. Five import titles were however released: S.C.A.T. on February 4 (originally released as Action in New York), Natsume Championship Wrestling on February 18, Final Fantasy III on March 18, The Ignition Factor on April 29 and Chrono Trigger on May 20.
The VC service went on hiatus with no new releases from July.
The Sega Master System version of R-Type was removed from the VC service on September 30.

2012
Starting from this year, Hamster Corporation will publish all of Jaleco's VC releases.
Teenage Mutant Ninja Turtles was removed from the VC service on January 26.
All of G-mode's releases (Bloody Wolf, Drop Off and Silent Debuggers) were removed from the VC service on March 14.
All of Irem's releases (Legend of Hero Tonma, Ninja Spirit, the TurboGrafx version of R-Type, R-Type III: The Third Lightning, Super R-Type and Vigilante) were removed from the VC service on March 31.
No Hanabi Festival was held this year. One import title was however released: Monster World IV (which received an English translation/localization for its VC release) on May 10.
Donkey Kong Country, Donkey Kong Country 2: Diddy's Kong Quest and Donkey Kong Country 3: Dixie Kong's Double Trouble! were removed from the VC service on November 25.

2013
All of Commodore Gaming's 18 releases (see the Commodore 64 section above) were removed from the VC service in the beginning of August.
Sengoku 3 was released on September 5 as the final new addition to the service on Wii.
All of Irem's Turbografx releases (Legend of Hero Tonma, Ninja Spirit, R-Type and Vigilante) were reinstated on the VC service on September 19.
Yoshi's Cookie was removed from the VC service on October 11.
All of Activision's releases (Pitfall: The Mayan Adventure and Shanghai II: Dragon's Eye) were removed from the VC service on December 31.

2014
The Donkey Kong Country trilogy of games were reinstated on the VC service on October 30, alongside the games' gradual re-release on the Nintendo eShop for Wii U.

2017
 SimEarth: The Living Planet  was removed from the VC service sometime in July 2017.
 On September 29, it was announced that Nintendo planned to close the Wii Shop Channel by January 31, 2019, with the ability to add Wii Points being removed on March 26, 2018.

2018
 The ability to add Wii Points for the purchase of new games was removed on March 26, due to the closure of the Wii Shop Channel in 2019.

2019
 The Wii Shop Channel closed on January 31, therefore making it no longer possible to purchase new Virtual Console or WiiWare games for the Wii system.

See also
List of Virtual Console games for Nintendo 3DS (PAL region)
List of Virtual Console games for Wii U (PAL region)
List of WiiWare games
List of WiiWare games (PAL region)

References

Virtual Console games for Wii
Virtual Console games for Wii

fr:Liste de jeux disponibles sur la console virtuelle en Europe
it:Lista di videogiochi per Virtual Console
no:Liste over Virtual Console-spill
pt:Anexo:Lista de jogos da Virtual Console (Europa)